K27 or K-27 may refer to:
 K-27 (Kansas highway)
 , a corvette of the Royal Navy
 Kandi K27, a Chinese city car
 Rio Grande class K-27, an American steam locomotive
 Sonata in G, K. 27, by Wolfgang Amadeus Mozart